Pattara Piyapatrakitti (born 11 June 1980), formerly known as Pattarakorn Thanganuruck or Punuwat Tangunurat, also simply known as James, is a Thai retired professional footballer who plays as a goalkeeper.

Honours

Club
Krung Thai Bank
 Thai Premier League: 2002-03, 2003-04

PEA
 Thai Premier League: 2008

Thai Port
 Thai FA Cup: 2009
 Thai League Cup: 2010

Chiangrai United
 Thai FA Cup: 2017

International
Thailand U-23
 Sea Games Gold Medal: 2001, 2003

References

External links
 Pattara Piyapatrakitti at Goal.com
 
 
 
 Punuwat Tangunurat at 11v11.com

1980 births
Living people
Pattara Piyapatrakitti
Pattara Piyapatrakitti
Association football goalkeepers
Pattara Piyapatrakitti
Pattara Piyapatrakitti
Pattara Piyapatrakitti
Pattara Piyapatrakitti
Pattara Piyapatrakitti
Pattara Piyapatrakitti
Pattara Piyapatrakitti
Pattara Piyapatrakitti
Pattara Piyapatrakitti
Pattara Piyapatrakitti
Pattara Piyapatrakitti
Pattara Piyapatrakitti
Footballers at the 2002 Asian Games
2004 AFC Asian Cup players
Southeast Asian Games medalists in football
Pattara Piyapatrakitti
Competitors at the 2001 Southeast Asian Games
Competitors at the 2003 Southeast Asian Games
Pattara Piyapatrakitti